Europium is a chemical element with the symbol Eu and atomic number 63. Europium is the most reactive lanthanide by far, having to be stored under an inert fluid to protect it from atmospheric oxygen or moisture. Europium is also the softest lanthanide, as it can be dented with a fingernail and easily cut with a knife. When oxidation is removed a shiny-white metal is visible. Europium was isolated in 1901 and is named after the continent of Europe. Being a typical member of the lanthanide series, europium usually assumes the oxidation state +3, but the oxidation state +2 is also common. All europium compounds with oxidation state +2 are slightly reducing. Europium has no significant biological role and is relatively non-toxic as compared to other heavy metals. Most applications of europium exploit the phosphorescence of europium compounds. Europium is one of the rarest of the rare-earth elements on Earth.

Characteristics

Physical properties

Europium is a ductile metal with a hardness similar to that of lead. It crystallizes in a body-centered cubic lattice. Some properties of europium are strongly influenced by its half-filled electron shell. Europium has the second lowest melting point and the lowest density of all lanthanides.

Europium has been claimed to become a superconductor when it is cooled below 1.8 K and compressed to above 80 GPa. However the experimental evidence on which this claim is based has  been challenged, and the paper reporting superconductivity has been subsequently retracted. If it becomes a superconductor this is believed to occur because europium is divalent in the metallic state, and is converted into the trivalent state by the applied pressure. In the divalent state, the strong local magnetic moment (J = 7/2) suppresses the superconductivity, which is induced by eliminating this local moment (J = 0 in Eu3+).

Chemical properties
Europium is the most reactive rare-earth element. It rapidly oxidizes in air, so that bulk oxidation of a centimeter-sized sample occurs within several days. Its reactivity with water is comparable to that of calcium, and the reaction is
2 Eu + 6 H2O → 2 Eu(OH)3 + 3 H2

Because of the high reactivity, samples of solid europium rarely have the shiny appearance of the fresh metal, even when coated with a protective layer of mineral oil. Europium ignites in air at 150 to 180 °C to form europium(III) oxide:
4 Eu + 3 O2 → 2 Eu2O3

Europium dissolves readily in dilute sulfuric acid to form pale pink solutions of [Eu(H2O)9]3+:
2 Eu + 3 H2SO4 + 18 H2O → 2 [Eu(H2O)9]3+ + 3  + 3 H2

Eu(II) vs. Eu(III)
Although usually trivalent, europium readily forms divalent compounds. This behavior is unusual for most lanthanides, which almost exclusively form compounds with an oxidation state of +3. The +2 state has an electron configuration 4f7 because the half-filled f-shell provides more stability. In terms of size and coordination number, europium(II) and barium(II) are similar. The sulfates of both barium and europium(II) are also highly insoluble in water. Divalent europium is a mild reducing agent, oxidizing in air to form Eu(III) compounds. In anaerobic, and particularly geothermal conditions, the divalent form is sufficiently stable that it tends to be incorporated into minerals of calcium and the other alkaline earths. This ion-exchange process is the basis of the "negative europium anomaly", the low europium content in many lanthanide minerals such as monazite, relative to the chondritic abundance. Bastnäsite tends to show less of a negative europium anomaly than does monazite, and hence is the major source of europium today. The development of easy methods to separate divalent europium from the other (trivalent) lanthanides made europium accessible even when present in low concentration, as it usually is.

Isotopes

Naturally occurring europium is composed of two isotopes, 151Eu and 153Eu, which occur in almost equal proportions; 153Eu is slightly more abundant (52.2% natural abundance). This value is in reasonable agreement with theoretical predictions. Besides the natural radioisotope 151Eu, 35 artificial radioisotopes have been characterized, the most stable being 150Eu with a half-life of 36.9 years, 152Eu with a half-life of 13.516 years, and 154Eu with a half-life of 8.593 years. All the remaining radioactive isotopes have half-lives shorter than 4.7612 years, and the majority of these have half-lives shorter than 12.2 seconds; the known isotopes of europium range from 130Eu to 170Eu. This element also has 17 meta states, with the most stable being 150mEu (t1/2=12.8 hours), 152m1Eu (t1/2=9.3116 hours) and 152m2Eu (t1/2=96 minutes).

The primary decay mode for isotopes lighter than 153Eu is electron capture, and the primary mode for heavier isotopes is beta minus decay. The primary decay products before 153Eu are isotopes of samarium (Sm) and the primary products after are isotopes of gadolinium (Gd).

Europium as a nuclear fission product

Europium is produced by nuclear fission, but the fission product yields of europium isotopes are low near the top of the mass range for fission products.

As with other lanthanides, many isotopes of europium, especially those that have odd mass numbers or are neutron-poor like 152Eu, have high cross sections for neutron capture, often high enough to be neutron poisons.

151Eu is the beta decay product of samarium-151, but since this has a long decay half-life and short mean time to neutron absorption, most 151Sm instead ends up as 152Sm.

152Eu (half-life 13.516 years) and 154Eu (half-life 8.593 years) cannot be beta decay products because 152Sm and 154Sm are non-radioactive, but 154Eu is the only long-lived "shielded" nuclide, other than 134Cs, to have a fission yield of more than 2.5 parts per million fissions. A larger amount of 154Eu is produced by neutron activation of a significant portion of the non-radioactive 153Eu; however, much of this is further converted to 155Eu.

155Eu (half-life 4.7612 years) has a fission yield of 330 parts per million (ppm) for uranium-235 and thermal neutrons; most of it is transmuted to non-radioactive and nonabsorptive gadolinium-156 by the end of fuel burnup.

Overall, europium is overshadowed by caesium-137 and strontium-90 as a radiation hazard, and by samarium and others as a neutron poison.

Occurrence

Europium is not found in nature as a free element. Many minerals contain europium, with the most important sources being bastnäsite, monazite, xenotime and loparite-(Ce). No europium-dominant minerals are known yet, despite a single find of a tiny possible Eu–O or Eu–O–C system phase in the Moon's regolith.

Depletion or enrichment of europium in minerals relative to other rare-earth elements is known as the europium anomaly. Europium is commonly included in trace element studies in geochemistry and petrology to understand the processes that form igneous rocks (rocks that cooled from magma or lava). The nature of the europium anomaly found helps reconstruct the relationships within a suite of igneous rocks. The average crustal abundance of europium is 2–2.2 ppm.

Divalent europium (Eu2+) in small amounts is the activator of the bright blue fluorescence of some samples of the mineral fluorite (CaF2). The reduction from Eu3+ to Eu2+ is induced by irradiation with energetic particles. The most outstanding examples of this originated around Weardale and adjacent parts of northern England; it was the fluorite found here that fluorescence was named after in 1852, although it was not until much later that europium was determined to be the cause.

In astrophysics, the signature of europium in stellar spectra can be used to classify stars and inform theories of how or where a particular star was born. For instance, astronomers in 2019 identified higher-than-expected levels of europium within the star J1124+4535, hypothesizing that this star originated in a dwarf galaxy that collided with the Milky Way billions of years ago.

Production
Europium is associated with the other rare-earth elements and is, therefore, mined together with them. Separation of the rare-earth elements occurs during later processing. Rare-earth elements are found in the minerals bastnäsite, loparite-(Ce), xenotime, and monazite in mineable quantities. Bastnäsite is a group of related fluorocarbonates, Ln(CO3)(F,OH). Monazite is a group of related of orthophosphate minerals  (Ln denotes a mixture of all the lanthanides except promethium), loparite-(Ce) is an oxide, and xenotime is an orthophosphate (Y,Yb,Er,...)PO4. Monazite also contains thorium and yttrium, which complicates handling because thorium and its decay products are radioactive. For the extraction from the ore and the isolation of individual lanthanides, several methods have been developed. The choice of method is based on the concentration and composition of the ore and on the distribution of the individual lanthanides in the resulting concentrate. Roasting the ore, followed by acidic and basic leaching, is used mostly to produce a concentrate of lanthanides. If cerium is the dominant lanthanide, then it is converted from cerium(III) to cerium(IV) and then precipitated. Further separation by solvent extractions or ion exchange chromatography yields a fraction which is enriched in europium. This fraction is reduced with zinc, zinc/amalgam, electrolysis or other methods converting the europium(III) to europium(II). Europium(II) reacts in a way similar to that of alkaline earth metals and therefore it can be precipitated as a carbonate or co-precipitated with barium sulfate. Europium metal is available through the electrolysis of a mixture of molten EuCl3 and NaCl (or CaCl2) in a graphite cell, which serves as cathode, using graphite as anode. The other product is chlorine gas.

A few large deposits produce or produced a significant amount of the world production. The Bayan Obo iron ore deposit in Inner Mongolia contains significant amounts of bastnäsite and monazite and is, with an estimated 36 million tonnes of rare-earth element oxides, the largest known deposit. The mining operations at the Bayan Obo deposit made China the largest supplier of rare-earth elements in the 1990s. Only 0.2% of the rare-earth element content is europium. The second large source for rare-earth elements between 1965 and its closure in the late 1990s was the Mountain Pass rare earth mine in California. The bastnäsite mined there is especially rich in the light rare-earth elements (La-Gd, Sc, and Y) and contains only 0.1% of europium. Another large source for rare-earth elements is the loparite found on the Kola peninsula. It contains besides niobium, tantalum and titanium up to 30% rare-earth elements and is the largest source for these elements in Russia.

Compounds

Europium compounds tend to exist in a trivalent oxidation state under most conditions. Commonly these compounds feature Eu(III) bound by 6–9 oxygenic ligands, typically water. These compounds, the chlorides, sulfates, nitrates, are soluble in water or polar organic solvent. Lipophilic europium complexes often feature acetylacetonate-like ligands, e.g., EuFOD.

Halides
Europium metal reacts with all the halogens:
2 Eu + 3 X2 → 2 EuX3 (X = F, Cl, Br, I)
This route gives white europium(III) fluoride (EuF3), yellow europium(III) chloride (EuCl3), gray europium(III) bromide (EuBr3), and colorless europium(III) iodide (EuI3). Europium also forms the corresponding dihalides: yellow-green europium(II) fluoride (EuF2), colorless europium(II) chloride (EuCl2) (although it has a bright blue fluorescence under UV light), colorless europium(II) bromide (EuBr2), and green europium(II) iodide (EuI2).

Chalcogenides and pnictides
Europium forms stable compounds with all of the chalcogens, but the heavier chalcogens (S, Se, and Te) stabilize the lower oxidation state. Three oxides are known: europium(II) oxide (EuO), europium(III) oxide (Eu2O3), and the mixed-valence oxide Eu3O4, consisting of both Eu(II) and Eu(III). Otherwise, the main chalcogenides are europium(II) sulfide (EuS), europium(II) selenide (EuSe) and europium(II) telluride (EuTe): all three of these are black solids. Europium(II) sulfide is prepared by sulfiding the oxide at temperatures sufficiently high to decompose the Eu2O3:
Eu2O3 + 3 H2S → 2 EuS + 3 H2O + S
The main nitride of europium is europium(III) nitride (EuN).

History
Although europium is present in most of the minerals containing the other rare elements, due to the difficulties in separating the elements it was not until the late 1800s that the element was isolated. William Crookes observed the phosphorescent spectra of the rare elements including those eventually assigned to europium.

Europium was first found in 1892 by Paul Émile Lecoq de Boisbaudran, who obtained basic fractions from samarium-gadolinium concentrates which had spectral lines not accounted for by samarium or gadolinium. However, the discovery of europium is generally credited to French chemist Eugène-Anatole Demarçay, who suspected samples of the recently discovered element samarium were contaminated with an unknown element in 1896 and who was able to isolate it in 1901; he then named it europium.

When the europium-doped yttrium orthovanadate red phosphor was discovered in the early 1960s, and understood to be about to cause a revolution in the color television industry, there was a scramble for the limited supply of europium on hand among the monazite processors, as the typical europium content in monazite is about 0.05%. However, the Molycorp bastnäsite deposit at the Mountain Pass rare earth mine, California, whose lanthanides had an unusually high europium content of 0.1%, was about to come on-line and provide sufficient europium to sustain the industry. Prior to europium, the color-TV red phosphor was very weak, and the other phosphor colors had to be muted, to maintain color balance. With the brilliant red europium phosphor, it was no longer necessary to mute the other colors, and a much brighter color TV picture was the result. Europium has continued to be in use in the TV industry ever since as well as in computer monitors. Californian bastnäsite now faces stiff competition from Bayan Obo, China, with an even "richer" europium content of 0.2%.

Frank Spedding, celebrated for his development of the ion-exchange technology that revolutionized the rare-earth industry in the mid-1950s, once related the story of how he was lecturing on the rare earths in the 1930s, when an elderly gentleman approached him with an offer of a gift of several pounds of europium oxide. This was an unheard-of quantity at the time, and Spedding did not take the man seriously. However, a package duly arrived in the mail, containing several pounds of genuine europium oxide. The elderly gentleman had turned out to be Herbert Newby McCoy, who had developed a famous method of europium purification involving redox chemistry.

Applications

Relative to most other elements, commercial applications for europium are few and rather specialized. Almost invariably, its phosphorescence is exploited, either in the +2 or +3 oxidation state.

It is a dopant in some types of glass in lasers and other optoelectronic devices. Europium oxide (Eu2O3) is widely used as a red phosphor in television sets and fluorescent lamps, and as an activator for yttrium-based phosphors. Color TV screens contain between 0.5 and 1 g of europium oxide. Whereas trivalent europium gives red phosphors, the luminescence of divalent europium depends strongly on the composition of the host structure. UV to deep red luminescence can be achieved. The two classes of europium-based phosphor (red and blue), combined with the yellow/green terbium phosphors give "white" light, the color temperature of which can be varied by altering the proportion or specific composition of the individual phosphors. This phosphor system is typically encountered in helical fluorescent light bulbs. Combining the same three classes is one way to make trichromatic systems in TV and computer screens, but as an additive, it can be particularly effective in improving the intensity of red phosphor. Europium is also used in the manufacture of fluorescent glass, increasing the general efficiency of fluorescent lamps. One of the more common persistent after-glow phosphors besides copper-doped zinc sulfide is europium-doped strontium aluminate. Europium fluorescence is used to interrogate biomolecular interactions in drug-discovery screens. It is also used in the anti-counterfeiting phosphors in euro banknotes.

An application that has almost fallen out of use with the introduction of affordable superconducting magnets is the use of europium complexes, such as Eu(fod)3, as shift reagents in NMR spectroscopy. Chiral shift reagents, such as Eu(hfc)3, are still used to determine enantiomeric purity.

A theorized application of europium is its use in stopping thermonuclear threats. Due to its high neutron capture cross-section and neutron poison chain it is preferred for neutron poison based anti-thermonuclear missiles.

Precautions

There are no clear indications that europium is particularly toxic compared to other heavy metals. Europium chloride, nitrate and oxide have been tested for toxicity: europium chloride shows an acute intraperitoneal LD50 toxicity of 550 mg/kg and the acute oral LD50 toxicity is 5000 mg/kg. Europium nitrate shows a slightly higher intraperitoneal LD50 toxicity of 320 mg/kg, while the oral toxicity is above 5000 mg/kg. The metal dust presents a fire and explosion hazard.

References

External links

 It's Elemental – Europium

 
Chemical elements
Chemical elements with body-centered cubic structure
Lanthanides
Neutron poisons
Reducing agents